Kanik may refer to:

People
 Ľudovít Kaník (born 1965), Slovak politician
 Mateusz Kanik, Polish video game designer
 Orhan Veli Kanık (1914–1950), Turkish poet
 Tytus Kanik (born 1984), Polish darts player

Other
 Kanik, winter camping program of Philmont Scout Ranch
 Kanik, Iran, village in eastern Iran

See also
 
 Kanika (disambiguation)